This is a list of islands of the Comoros.

Major islands
Anjouan
Grande Comore
Mohéli
The three islands under the control of the Comoros have the status of autonomous islands (formerly governorates).

Minor islands

Ajangua Islands
Angaziga
Aombe
Bambo Island
Bandeli
Buni
Buzi
Cacazou
Canzuni
Chissioua Bouelachamba
Chissioua Bouelamahombe
Chissioua Bouelamanga
Chissioua Bouelamiradji
Chissioua Chandzi
Chissioua Chikoundou
Chissioua Dzaha
Chissioua Foro
Chissioua Gnandza
Chissioua Magnougni
Chissioua Mbougo

See also
ISO 3166-2:KM

 

Comoros
Comoros
Islands